This article summarizes the events, album releases, and album release dates in hip hop music for the year 2023.

Events

January
 On January 1, Gangsta Boo passed away of a drug overdose at the age of 43 in Memphis, Tennessee.
 On January 5, there was a shootout outside DJ Khaled's The Licking Restaurant in Miami, Florida, while filming a French Montana music video.
 On January 7, YoungBoy Never Broke Again married his girlfriend, Jazlyn Mychelle.
 On January 13, Kanye West married designer Bianca Censori.
 On January 16, Lil Tjay was arrested for gun possession in New York.
 On January 27, Drake's home was burglarized in Los Angeles.

February
 On February 5, Kendrick Lamar won both Best Rap Performance and Best Rap Song for "The Heart Part 5" at the 65th Annual Grammy Awards. Lamar also won the Best Rap Album for Mr. Morale & the Big Steppers, and Future won Best Melodic Rap Performance for "Wait for U", featuring Drake and Tems.
 On February 10, South African rapper AKA was fatally gunned down in Durban, KwaZulu-Natal.
 On February 12, Trugoy the Dove of De La Soul, passed away at the age of 54, with the cause of his death remaining undisclosed.
 On February 22, Eric Holder Jr. was sentenced to 60 years to life in prison for the murder of Nipsey Hussle in March 2019.
 On February 23, R. Kelly was sentenced in Chicago federal court to 20 years in prison for child pornography and other sexual crimes involving minors, with 19 years being concurrent to his previous 30-year term handed down in New York. Kelly will now serve 31 years in prison.

March
 On March 2, Lil Mosey was found not guilty of second-degree rape.
 On March 3, De La Soul's full discography became available on streaming services for the first time.
 On March 5, a stampede occurred at a GloRilla and Finesse2tymes concert in Rochester, New York, leaving three people dead and 7 people injured.

April 
 On April 2, Max B is set to be released from prison.
 On April 10, Tory Lanez is scheduled for his sentencing.
 Run-DMC to perform their final concert, at Madison Square Garden.

Released albums

January

February

March

Upcoming releases

March

April

May

June

July

Unscheduled and TBA

Highest-charting songs

Highest first-week consumption

All critically reviewed albums ranked

Metacritic

See also
 Previous article: 2022 in hip hop music

References

Hip hop music by year
hip hop